Forty Degrees in the Shade (Spanish:40 grados a la sombra) is a 1967 Argentine-Spanish comedy film directed by Mariano Ozores starring Gracita Morales, Antonio Ozores and Manuel Velasco.

Cast
 Gracita Morales as Filomena  
 Antonio Ozores as Evaristo  
 Manuel Velasco
 Xan das Bolas as Portero casa de Evaristo  
 Rafael Hernández as Taxista  
 Vicente Roca 
 José Manuel Martín 
 Julio Riscal as Caradura  
 Alfredo Landa as Máximo  
 Erika Wallner as Patricia  
 Julieta Serrano as Dorotea  
 Laly Soldevila as Amparo, cuñada de Máximo  
 Luis Rivera
 Venancio Muro as Empleado saneamientos Pereda  
 José Luis Carbonell 
 José Luis López Vázquez as Jacinto  
 Perla Cristal as Cándida  
 Goyo Lebrero as Rómulo, camarero  
 Rogelio Madrid as Carlos, repartidor del supermercado  
 Mario Morales 
 Ana María Morales 
 Paloma Cela 
 Lourdes Albert 
 Claudine Coppin as Claudine, cantante

References

Bibliography 
 Peter Cowie & Derek Elley. World Filmography: 1967. Fairleigh Dickinson University Press, 1977.

External links 
 

1967 films
1967 comedy films
Argentine comedy films
Spanish comedy films
1960s Spanish-language films
Films directed by Mariano Ozores
1960s Argentine films